Pastorano is a comune (municipality) in the Province of Caserta in the Italian region Campania, located about  north of Naples and about  northwest of Caserta.  Pastorano borders the following municipalities: Camigliano, Giano Vetusto, Pignataro Maggiore, Vitulazio.

The Treaty of Casalanza was signed here in 1815 between the Austrian and Neapolitan armies, after the latter's king, Joachim Murat, had been defeated in the Battle of Tolentino.

References

Cities and towns in Campania